Phillip "Phil" Rhodes (born May 26, 1968) is an American rock drummer and percussionist, best known from his work in the Alternative rock band the Gin Blossoms.
Phillip played drums with the Gin Blossoms until 2005.

References

1968 births
Living people
American rock drummers
Gin Blossoms members
Alternative rock drummers
20th-century American drummers
American male drummers
Musicians from Phoenix, Arizona
American alternative rock musicians